The 29th Trampoline World Championships was held at the Armeets Arena in Sofia, Bulgaria, from November 7–10, 2013.

Medal summary

Medal table

Results

Men's results

Individual Trampoline
Qualification

Final
The men's individual trampoline final was held on November 9.

Synchro
The men's synchro event was held on November 10.

Trampoline Team
The men's trampoline team final was held on November 8.

Double Mini
The men's double mini event was held on November 10.

Double Mini Team
The men's double mini team final was held on November 9.

Tumbling
The men's tumbling event was held on November 10.

Tumbling Team
The men's tumbling team final was held on November 9.

Women's results

Individual Trampoline
Qualification

Final
The women's individual trampoline event was held on November 10.

Synchro
The women's synchro final was held on November 9.

Trampoline Team
The women's trampoline team final was held on November 8.

Double Mini
The women's double mini event was held on November 10.

Double Mini Team
The women's double mini team final was held on November 9.

Tumbling
The women's individual tumbling final was held on November 10.

Tumbling Team
The women's tumbling team final was held on November 9.

References

External links

2013 in gymnastics
2013 in Bulgarian sport
International gymnastics competitions hosted by Bulgaria
2013
Sports competitions in Sofia